Alfred Albert Masino (February 5, 1928 – August 16, 2006) was an American professional basketball player. He played in the National Basketball Association for the Milwaukee Hawks, Rochester Royals, and Syracuse Nationals.

References

1928 births
2006 deaths
American Basketball League (1925–1955) players
American men's basketball players
Basketball players from New York (state)
Canisius Golden Griffins men's basketball players
High school basketball coaches in the United States
Milwaukee Hawks players
People from Richmond, New York
Point guards
Rochester Royals players
Syracuse Nationals players
Undrafted National Basketball Association players
Utica Pros players